Migrant literature is either written by migrants or tells the stories of migrants and their migration. It is a topic of growing interest within literary studies since the 1980s. Migrants are people who have left their homes and cultural settings and who started a new life in another setting that is, in most cases, initially strange to them.

Settings
Although any experience of migration would qualify an author to be classed under migrant literature, the main focus of recent research has been on the principal channels of mass-migration in the twentieth century.  These include: European migration to North America or Australia; migration from former colonies to Europe (Black British literature, British-Asian literature, French Beur literature); situations of ethnic cleansing such as the mass migration of people from India to Pakistan where the subcontinent was partitioned into Hindu-majority India and Muslim-majority Pakistan after the British left in 1947; guest worker programs (Turks, Italians or Greeks in Germany and Holland); exile situations, such as that of exiled German dissidents during the Nazi period.

Themes
Migrant literature often focuses on the social contexts in the migrants' country of origin which prompt them to leave, on the experience of migration itself, on the mixed reception which they may receive in the country of arrival, on experiences of racism and hostility, and on the sense of rootlessness and the search for identity which can result from displacement and cultural diversity.

Relationship to post-colonial literature

Colonialism often creates a setting which results in the migration of large numbers of people, either within the colonies or from them to the "imperial centre" (Britain, France etc.).  Consequently, migrant literature and postcolonial literature show some considerable overlap.  However, not all migration takes place in a colonial setting, and not all postcolonial literature deals with migration.  A question of current debate is the extent to which postcolonial theory also speaks to migration literature of non-colonial settings.  The presence in central Europe of Gastarbeiter communities, for example, is not a result of colonialism, yet their literature does have much in common with, say, British-Asian literature.

Categories
A number of categories have been developed for discussing migrant literature.  Some of these are the standard categories of post-colonial theory, while others have been worked out precisely to cope with non-colonial settings.

Displacement
Displacement is a key term in post-colonial theory which applies to all migrant situations.  It refers both to physical displacement and a sense of being socially or culturally "out of place".

Guest and host communities
Picking up on the term Gastarbeiter and using it affirmatively, Rafik Schami and Franco Boindi used the terminology of guest in 1981 and host to express some of the dynamics of migrant situations. The term describes the frustrations from many migrant authors about the lack of acceptance, poor working conditions, racism and difficulties with integration.

Emigrant versus immigrant perspectives
It is possible to distinguish the "emigrant perspective" of the migrant whose main focus is backwards to the country of origin from the "immigrant perspective" of the migrant who is reconciled with the prospect of permanent residence in the country of arrival.

Primary and secondary migration
In relation to work migration, it is common for one member of a family, typically the father, to travel in search of work, the rest of the family following later. In the context of migration and family ties, "secondary migration" refers to the emigration of relatives to join the primary migrant.

(Alternatively, in other context related to migration, the expression "secondary migration" is also used to refer to the migration of an immigrant from their country of residence that is not their country of birth to yet another country. Sometimes it is also used to refer to the internal migration of an immigrant, that is, the migration of an immigrant to another state within the country of residence.)

First and second generation migrants
First generation migrants are those who, as adults, themselves made the move from one country to another.  Second generation migrants are the children of migrants, who were either very young at the time of migration or were born in the country of arrival.  The perspectives across the generations can differ enormously.  Some critics have even used the term "third generation migrants", though it is highly questionable whether this is meaningful: if a third generation is still culturally distinct it is probably more useful to speak of an established ethnic minority.

Between cultures
In literature of second generation migrants, a location "between" two cultures, sometimes called an "interstitial" space, is often mentioned as a way of expressing a sense of belonging in neither the guest nor the host community. Those whose experience has been more positive may reject the notion of "between" and feel that they live, rather, in the cultural overlap, not a void but a place of particular richness.

Hybridity
Hybridity is another catch-phrase from post-colonial theory which applies also to many non-colonial migrant situations.  It refers to the migrant's culturally mixed identity as the opposed forces of assimilation and the search for roots force a middle way.
(In post-colonial theory, the term hybridity is also used in non-migrant situations to refer to the impact of the culture of the colonisers on the culture of the colonised.)

Bilingual theory
Bilingualism is an essential component of hybridity.  Results of socio-linguistic research are therefore of importance to work on migrant literature.

See also
 Creolisation
 Postcolonialism
 Postmodernism
 Edward Said
 Homi K. Bhabha
 Postcolonial studies
 Jacques Derrida
 Deleuze and Guattari
 Victor Segalen

References

Literary criticism
Works about immigration
Foreign workers